Harford Furnace Historic District is a national historic district at Bel Air, Harford County, Maryland, United States. It consists of five standing structures and several archeological sites associated with the operation of the iron furnace which began about 1830 and continued to function until 1876. The district side is both open and wooded and includes land on both sides of James Run, a small south-flowing tributary of the Bush River.

It was added to the National Register of Historic Places in 1990.

References

External links
, including photo dated 1989, at Maryland Historical Trust

Historic districts in Harford County, Maryland
Historic districts on the National Register of Historic Places in Maryland
Industrial buildings and structures on the National Register of Historic Places in Maryland
National Register of Historic Places in Harford County, Maryland